Tirthankar Sarkar (born 1 July 1993 in Kolkata, West Bengal) is an Indian professional footballer who plays as a midfielder for Diamond Harbour FC in the Calcutta Football League.

Career

Early career
Tirthankar is the product of Mohun Bagan SAIL Football Academy, Durgapur. Tirthankar was part of the Academy team that participated in the Manchester United Premier Cup and played in the final round held at Manchester. He also went to 3 overseas tours for Mohun Bagan SAIL Football Academy, to Singapore, Thailand and England. After passing out from Mohun Bagan SAIL Football Academy, Tirthankar played for Salgaocar 2009-2010.

Pailan Arrows
After starting his career in the Mohun Bagan and Salgaocar youth teams Sarkar signed with I-League club Pailan Arrows. He then made his debut against Sporting Clube de Goa in the I-League on 13 January 2012, Pailan lost the match 2–3. Sarkar then scored his second goal for Pailan Arrows on 28 January 2013 against United Sikkim F.C. to equalize in the 86th minute for his side as the game ended 1–1.

Mohun Bagan
On 12 June 2014 it was confirmed that Tirthankar has signed for Mohun Bagan.

Career statistics

Club

Personal life
Tirthankar's favourite players are Renedy Singh, Steven Gerrard and Luis Suárez. He supports England national football team and Germany national football team. He also supports Liverpool F.C among the European clubs.

Honours

Club
Mohun Bagan
Calcutta Football League (1): 2018–19

References

Indian footballers
1993 births
Living people
Footballers from Kolkata
Footballers from West Bengal
I-League players
Indian Arrows players
Churchill Brothers FC Goa players
Mohun Bagan AC players
India youth international footballers
Association football wingers
Southern Samity players
Mohammedan SC (Kolkata) players
Calcutta Football League players